In the geologic timescale the Ypresian is the oldest age or lowest stratigraphic stage of the Eocene. The Ypresian is consistent with the lower Eocene.

Events
The Ypresian Age begins during the throes of the Paleocene–Eocene Thermal Maximum (PETM). The Fur Formation in Denmark, the Messel shales in Germany, the Oise amber of France and Cambay amber of India are of this age.  The Eocene Okanagan Highlands are an uplands subtropical to temperate series of lakes from the Ypresian.

Stratigraphic definition
The Ypresian Stage was introduced in scientific literature by Belgian geologist André Hubert Dumont in 1850. The Ypresian is named after the Flemish city of Ypres in Belgium (spelled Ieper in Dutch). The definitions of the original stage were totally different from the modern ones. The Ypresian shares its name with the Belgian Ieper Group (French: Groupe d'Ypres), which has an Ypresian age.

The base of the Ypresian Stage is defined at a strong negative anomaly in δ13C values at the PETM. The official reference profile (GSSP) for the base of the Ypresian is the Dababiya profile near the Egyptian city of Luxor. Its original type section was located in the vicinity of Ieper.

The top of the Ypresian (the base of the Lutetian) is identified by the first appearance of the foraminifera genus Hantkenina in the fossil record.

The Ypresian Stage overlaps the upper Neustrian and most of the Grauvian European Land Mammal Mega Zones (it spans the Mammal Paleogene zones 7 through 10.), the Wasatchian and lower and middle Bridgerian North American Land Mammal Ages, the Casamayoran South American Land Mammal Age and the Bumbanian and most of the Arshantan Asian Land Mammal Ages. It is also coeval with the upper Wangerripian and lowest Johannian regional stages of Australia and the Bulitian, Penutian and Ulatisian regional stages of California.

References

Literature

Dumont, A. H.; 1850: Rapport sur la carte géologique du Royaume, Bulletins de l’Académie Royale des Sciences, des Lettres et des Beaux-Arts de Belgique 16 (2), pp. 351–373. 
Dupuis, C.; Aubry, M.; Steurbaut, É; Berggren, W. A.; Ouda, K.; Magioncalda, R.; Cramer, B. S.; Kent, D. V.; Speijer, R. P. & Heilmann-Clausen, C.; 2003: The Dababiya Quarry Section: Lithostratigraphy, clay mineralogy, geochemistry and paleontology, Micropaleontology 49 (1), pp. 41–59, .
Gradstein, F. M.; Ogg, J. G. & Smith, A. G.; 2004: A Geologic Time Scale 2004, Cambridge University Press.
Steurbaut, É.; 2006: Ypresian , Geologica Belgica 9 (1–2), pp. 73–93.

External links
GeoWhen Database – Ypresian
Paleogene timescale, at the website of the subcommission for stratigraphic information of the ICS
Stratigraphic chart of the Paleogene, at the website of Norges Network of offshore records of geology and stratigraphy

 
Eocene geochronology
 
Geological ages